This is a list of hospitals in Canada.

Alberta
For a list sorted by facility name see List of hospitals in Alberta

Banff
Banff Mineral Springs Hospital
Bassano
Bassano Health Centre
Calgary
Alberta Children's Hospital (ACH)
Foothills Medical Centre (FMC)
Peter Lougheed Centre (PLC)
Rockyview General Hospital (RGH)
Sheldon M. Chumir Centre
South Health Campus (SHC)
Tom Baker Cancer Centre (TBCC)
Canmore
Canmore General Hospital
Edmonton 
Alberta Hospital Edmonton
Cross Cancer Institute
Devon General Hospital
Glenrose Rehabilitation Hospital
Grey Nuns Community Hospital & Health Centre
Leduc Community Hospital & Health Centre
Misericordia Community Hospital
Northeast Community Health Centre
Royal Alexandra Hospital
University of Alberta Hospital 
Stollery Children's Hospital
Lethbridge
Chinook Regional Hospital
Lloydminster
Lloydminster Hospital (in Saskatchewan)
Medicine Hat
Medicine Hat Regional Hospital
Milk River
Milk River Health Centre
Stony Plain
WestView Health Centre
Vulcan
Vulcan Community Health Centre
Whitecourt
Whitecourt Healthcare Centre

British Columbia
For a list sorted by facility name see List of hospitals in British Columbia

Abbotsford
Abbotsford Regional Hospital and Cancer Centre
Burnaby
Burnaby Hospital
Chilliwack
Chilliwack General Hospital
Coquitlam
Riverview Hospital
Delta
Delta Hospital
Hope
Fraser Canyon Hospital
Kamloops
Royal Inland Hospital
Kelowna
Kelowna General Hospital
Langley
Langley Memorial Hospital
Maple Ridge
Ridge Meadows Hospital
Mission
Mission Memorial Hospital
Nanaimo
Nanaimo Regional General Hospital
New Westminster
Royal Columbian Hospital
North Vancouver
Lions Gate Hospital
Oliver
South Okanagan General Hospital
Parksville
Port Moody
Eagle Ridge Hospital
Richmond
Richmond Hospital (RGH)
Saanich
Saanich Peninsula Hospital
Surrey
Surrey Memorial Hospital
Terrace
Mills Memorial Hospital
Vancouver
BC Cancer Agency
British Columbia's Children's Hospital & Sunny Hill Health Centre for Children
B.C. Women's Hospital & Health Centre
G. F. Strong Centre
Mary Pack Arthritis Centre
Mount Saint Joseph Hospital
St. Paul's Hospital
Vancouver Hospital and Health Sciences Centre
Vancouver General Hospital
Vernon
Vernon Jubilee Hospital
Victoria
Royal Jubilee Hospital
Victoria General Hospital
White Rock
Peace Arch Hospital

Manitoba

Brandon
 Brandon Regional Health Centre
Steinbach
Bethesda Hospital
Portage la Prairie
Portage District General Hospital
Winnipeg
The Children's Hospital of Winnipeg
Concordia Hospital
Deer Lodge Centre
Grace Hospital
Health Sciences Centre
Misericordia Health Centre
Riverview Health Centre
Saint Boniface General Hospital
Seven Oaks General Hospital
Victoria General Hospital

New Brunswick

Newfoundland and Labrador
Government of Newfoundland and Labrador - List of regional services by Health Region
St. John's
Janeway Children's Health and Rehabilitation Centre

Northwest Territories
 Hay River Regional Health Centre
 Inuvik Regional Hospital 
 Stanton Territorial Hospital

Nova Scotia

 Canso
 Eastern Memorial Hospital

 Cumberland County
 Cumberland Regional Health Care Centre, Upper Nappan

 Digby
 Digby General Hospital

 Glace Bay
 Glace Bay Hospital

 Guysborough
 Guysborough Memorial Hospital

Halifax Regional Municipality
Dartmouth
Dartmouth General Hospital
 East Coast Forensic Hospital 
Nova Scotia Hospital
Halifax Peninsula
IWK Health Centre
Queen Elizabeth II Health Sciences Centre
 Middle Musquodoboit
 Musquodoboit Valley Memorial Hospital

 Hants County
 Hants Community Hospital

 Inverness
 Inverness Consolidated Memorial Hospital

 Lunenburg
 Fishermen's Memorial Hospital

Middleton
Soldiers Memorial Hospital

 New Glasgow
 Aberdeen Hospital

 Sheet Harbour
 Eastern Shore Memorial Hospital

 Springhill
 All Saints Springhill Hospital 

 Sydney
Cape Breton Regional Hospital

 Sydney Mines
 Harbourview Hospital 
 Tatamagouche
 Lillian Fraser Memorial Hospital 
 Yarmouth 
 Yarmouth Regional Hospital

Nunavut
Iqaluit
Qikiqtani General Hospital

Ontario

Ajax
Lakeridge Health Ajax and Pickering
Alliston
Stevenson Memorial Hospital
Barrie
Royal Victoria Regional Health Centre
Bowmanville
Lakeridge Health Bowmanville
Brampton
Brampton Civic Hospital
Brampton Memorial Hospital Campus
Burlington
Joseph Brant Hospital
Campbellford
Campbellford Memorial Hospital
Cambridge
Cambridge Memorial Hospital
Cobourg
Northumberland Hills Hospital
Collingwood
Collingwood General and Marine Hospital
Deep River
Deep River and District Hospital
Georgetown
Georgetown Hospital
Grimsby
West Lincoln Memorial Hospital
Hamilton
Hamilton Health Sciences
Hamilton General Hospital
Juravinski Hospital and Cancer Centre
McMaster University Medical Centre
McMaster Children's Hospital
St. Peter's Hospital
St. Joseph's Healthcare Hamilton
West 5th campus
Charlton campus
Kingston
Kingston General Hospital
Hotel Dieu
Providence Continuing Care Centre (PCCC)
Kirkland Lake
Kirkland and District Hospital
Kitchener
Grand River Hospital
St. Mary's General Hospital
London
London Health Sciences Centre
Children's Hospital at London Health Sciences Centre
University Hospital
Victoria Hospital
Markdale
Grey Bruce Health Services
Meaford
Grey Bruce Health Services
Milton
Milton District Hospital
Mississauga
Credit Valley Hospital
Mississauga Hospital
North Bay
North Bay Regional Health Center
Oakville
Oakville-Trafalgar Memorial Hospital
Orangeville
Headwaters Health Care Centre
Oshawa
Lakeridge Health Oshawa
Ottawa (see also: List of hospitals in Ottawa)
Children's Hospital of Eastern Ontario (CHEO)
Montfort Hospital
National Defence Medical Centre
The Ottawa Hospital
Civic Hospital
General Hospital
Riverside Hospital
Queensway Carleton Hospital
University of Ottawa Heart Institute
Royal Ottawa Mental Health Centre
Owen Sound
Grey Bruce Health Services
Peterborough
Peterborough Regional Health Centre
Port Perry
Lakeridge Health Port Perry
Sarnia
Bluewater Health
Sault Ste. Marie
Sault Area Hospital
Sudbury
Health Sciences North
Thunder Bay
Thunder Bay Regional Health Sciences Centre
Toronto (see also: List of hospitals in Toronto)
Baycrest Health Sciences
Centre for Addiction and Mental Health
Etobicoke General Hospital
Hospital for Sick Children
Humber River Regional Hospital
Michael Garron Hospital
North York General Hospital
Queensway Health Centre
Scarborough Health Network
Birchmount Hospital
Centenary Hospital
Scarborough General Hospital
Sinai Health System
Bridgepoint Active Healthcare
Mount Sinai Hospital
St. John's Rehab Hospital
St. Joseph's Health Centre
St. Michael's Hospital
Sunnybrook Health Sciences Centre
Toronto Grace Health Centre
University Health Network
Princess Margaret Cancer Centre
Toronto General Hospital
Toronto Rehabilitation Institute
Toronto Western Hospital
Women's College Hospital
Uxbidge
Uxbridge Cottage Hospital
Wiarton
Wiarton Hospital
York Region
Cortellucci Vaughan Hospital
Mackenzie Richmond Hill Hospital
Markham Stouffville Hospital
Shouldice Hernia Centre
Southlake Regional Health Centre

Prince Edward Island
Charlottetown
Hillsborough Hospital
Queen Elizabeth Hospital
Summerside
Prince County Hospital

Quebec

Laval
Jewish Rehabilitation Hospital
Longueuil
Hôpital Charles-LeMoyne (affiliated to Université de Sherbrooke)
Centre hospitalier Pierre-Boucher

Montreal 
McGill University Health Centre
Royal Victoria Hospital 
Montreal Children's Hospital 
Shriners Hospital for Children  
Montreal Chest Institute 
Montreal General Hospital
Allan Memorial Institute 
Montreal Neurological Hospital
Hôpital de Lachine
Lakeshore General Hospital
Jewish General Hospital
St. Mary's Hospital
Douglas Mental Health University Institute
Centre hospitalier de l'Université de Montréal
Hopital Notre-Dame
Hôpital Maisonneuve-Rosemont
Hôpital du Sacré-Coeur de Montréal
Centre hospitalier universitaire Sainte-Justine
Institut de cardiologie de Montréal
Institut universitaire en santé mentale de Montréal
Institut Philippe-Pinel de Montréal
 Hôpital Santa-Cabrini
 Hôpital de Verdun
 Hôpital de LaSalle
 Hôpital Jean-Talon
 Hôpital Rivière-des-Prairies

Saint-Hyacinthe
Centre hospitalier Honoré-Mercier
Quebec City 
Centre hospitalier universitaire de Québec (CHUQ)
Hôtel-Dieu de Québec
Hôpital Saint-François d'Assise
Centre hospitalier de l'Université Laval (CHUL)
Institut universitaire de cardiologie et de pneumologie de Québec (IUCPQ)
Sherbrooke
Centre hospitalier universitaire de Sherbrooke (CHUS)

Saskatchewan

Humboldt
Humboldt District Hospital
Regina
Pasqua Hospital
Regina General Hospital
Wascana Rehabilitation Centre
Saskatoon
Royal University Hospital
Saskatoon City Hospital
St. Paul's Hospital
Jim Pattison Children's Hospital

Yukon
 Whitehorse General Hospital

References

 
 List
Canada